is a Japanese racing driver who currently competes in the Super GT series for Team apr Racing, driving a Toyota GR86 GT300 and in the Super Taikyu, driving Aston Martin Vantage GT4. He's a two-time JGTC/Super GT GT300 class champions.

Racing career

Early career 
Orido began his racing career as a street racer and then progressed to touge racing. He made his professional racing debut in 1990, where, sponsored by the Bandoh Chain of Commerce, Orido entered a drift contest organized by the automobile magazine CARBOY. He emerged as the grand champion and promptly moved on to circuit racing.

In 1992, Orido made his debut in the Fuji Freshman race for Yokohama Rubber. During his time in the Freshman series, Orido earned a class victory in the NA-1600 class in the Fuji Freshman, and a three-time winner in the Suzuka Freshman's N2-1600 class.

JGTC / Super GT

1996 - 1999: JGTC Debut and GT300 Dominance 

After years of one make series, he first appeared in the JGTC series in 1996, driving for Team JUN and Team Taisan Jr. as a part-time driver, before joining Team Bandoh as a full-time driver in 1997, winning the GT300 title for that year and continuing to perform well over the next two years, finishing 2nd overall in 1998 and 3rd overall in 1999.

He continued to occasionally compete in One-make racing series, even amid discussions of banning drivers who had won points in the Japanese Touring Car Championship races from competing in the series. Despite this he participated in the commemorative Altezza (Lexus IS) one-make race at Fuji Speedway on May 3rd 2000, driving a SXE10 RS200 Z Edition for team TOM'S and Uetake Racing and finishing 2nd overall.

2000: Moving up to GT500 
In 2000, Orido moved up to GT500, racing for Tsuchiya Engineering in the Toyota Supra alongside Mitsuhiro Kinoshita. Though he was consistently finishing in the points, his performance in the GT500 class was not as impressive as his early GT300 career, his highest finish a 7th place in the sixth round at Mine. The pair ended the season with only 11 points, placing them 18th overall.

2001 offered more of the same for Orido along with his new partner Seiji Ara, as the Team Tsuchiya's Toyota Supra was struggling for pace compared to the other Toyota teams. Their highest finish of the season was two 7th-place finishes at Twin Ring Motegi and Suzuka, while the team was unable to qualify for the race at Fuji. Team Tsuchiya ended the season with 11 points once more, but ranked 19th overall.

2002 - 2003: Finding Success in GT500 
At the first round of the 2002 season at TI Circuit Aida, Orido finished 3rd for Team SARD along with French driver Jérémie Dufour, this was Orido's first podium finish in GT500, and although they suffered retirements at the first Fuji race and Sepang and finishing outside the points in Sugo and the second Fuji race, Orido still finished in the points at the last three races to amass 33 points, ending the season 14th overall, Team SARD beating out Orido's former team, Team Tsuchiya and Team KRAFT in the standings.

Orido's best GT500 season came the following year with German driver Dominik Schwager as his new partner. Team SARD started off the season inconsistently, as they weren't able to score points at round 1 at TI Circuit and round 3 at Sugo, but managed to place 2nd in rounds 2 and 4, both of which were held at the Fuji Speedway races, The team carried on their good form by finishing 7th in the next two rounds at Fuji and Motegi, and scoring their first GT500 victory at Autopolis, before ending the season with a 9th-place finish at Suzuka. Orido and Team SARD ended the season with 57 points, 6th overall and 3rd among the Toyota teams.

2004 - 2007: Inconsistent Years 
Orido returned to Team Tsuchiya in 2004, with Schwagger also making the move to partner Orido once more for the season, their ADVAN Toyota Supra being the only Toyota team using Yokohama tires. In a season dominated by the Nissan's new Fairlady Z GT500 car, Orido and Schwagger still managed to score podium finishes at Sugo and Autopolis, but the ADVAN Supra's pace was inconsistent, ending the season with only 31 points and 12th overall, the lowest out of all the Toyota teams.

When the JGTC formally changed its name to Super GT In 2005, Orido and the ADVAN team started the season by winning the first race at Okayama, but like the previous season, the Yokohama team was struggling to be consistent in its pace, and while the other Toyota teams were scoring consistent points finishes, the ADVAN Supra only managed to finish in the points again at Sugo. Although the team finished with fewer points than the previous season at only 26 points and 13th overall, the team still finished ahead of the Denso SARD Supra in the standings.

The 2006 season saw Toyota introducing their new GT500 machine, the Lexus SC430, to the competition. With new codriver Takeshi Tsuchiya, Orido contested the season with the new Lexus, but the Team Tsuchiya's car paled in comparison to rival Toyota team TOM's, as Orido and Tsuchiya could only manage to get low scoring points finishes en route to 19th place overall, outperforming only the continually declining Team SARD amongst the Toyota teams in the standings.

In 2007, Orido and Tsuchiya managed to finish more races in the points compared to the previous year, but with the dominating performance put on by the ARTA NSX and consistently positive performances by other Toyota teams, Team Tsuchiya could only manage to get 20 points to end the season 17th overall, ranking 4th out of 6 Toyota teams, beating only Team SARD and Team KRAFT that showed lackluster form compared to the previous season.

2008: Return to Bandoh and Second GT300 Title 

In 2008, Orido returned to the GT300 class, racing once again for Racing Project Bandoh, who debuted their new Lexus IS350 GT300 car mid-season. The team struggled with the performance of the new cars in its first few races, but Orido managed to score a race victory at Twin Ring Motegi, following up with two points finishes in the last two races, ending his return season 12th overall.

The 2009 season saw Orido performing consistently as he did in his early years, scoring a race victory in the first round at Okayama, then following it up with consistent points finishes with podiums at Sepang and Autopolis, fighting against the JIMGAINER Ferrari 430 up until the final race at Motegi, where Orido and teammate Tatsuya Kataoka finished 3rd to claim the 2009 GT300 title, Orido's second GT300 championship title.

However, in 2010, Orido and the Bandoh Racing Project team endured a tough title defense season, as while they started the season strong, finishing on the podium at the first round in Suzuka, their three-year old Lexus IS350 struggled for pace as the season went on, unable to close the gap to the faster leaders, ultimately ending the season with only 33 points, 8th overall.

2010: Driving for JLOC 

When Bandoh Racing Project announced its intention to compete with a Lexus SC430 in the GT500 class the following year, Orido moved to the JLOC team, a team known for their Lamborghini race cars in Super GT, Orido was put in the #87 Gallardo RG-3 with Atsushi Yogo. In his first season with his new team, Orido finished on the podium twice, but finished outside the points in five races out of eight, ending the season with just 26 points and 11th overall.

In 2012, the team endured a rough start, with Orido's car finishing outside the points in the first race at Okayama, then retiring on the next two races at Fuji and Sepang, but bouncing back to finish 3rd in the next two races at Sugo and Suzuka, and ending the season with another 3rd-place finish at Twin Ring Motegi, placing 8th overall despite the dreadful start to the season.

The 2013 season for Orido was a disappointing one, with two retirements at Okayama and Fuji, and only three points scoring finishes at Sepang, Suzuka and Motegi. Orido ended the season with 22 points and 14th overall.

2014 showed further disappointing performances, with the Lamborghini Gallardos lacking pace compared to most of the GT300 field, with one retirement at Fuji and finishes outside the points for six of eight races, the only positive performance came in the fifth round in Sugo, where a clever tire strategy by the JLOC team brought Orido's #88 MANEPA Lamborghini its first race victory. The 20 points brought by the Sugo race win were the only points Orido scored during the 2014 season, ranking him 16th overall by the end of the season.

Outside Racing 

Outside his racing activities, Orido currently teaches safety driving at NATS (Nihon Automobile High Technical School).

He is also famous for being one of the three main hosts of the Hot Version segments of the long running Best Motoring DVD series, his co-hosts fellow racing drivers Nobuteru Taniguchi and Keiichi Tsuchiya.

In 2013, Orido opened the 130R Yokohama professional driving simulator facility, where he also acts as a coach for young drivers who want to improve their driving skills with the simulator. The 130R Yokohama facility is frequented by fellow racing driver Juichi Wakisaka and World Time Attack driver Tomohiko "Under" Suzuki and was also featured in one of the Video Option DVDs.

Orido owns the RIDOX brand that sells custom aero parts for the fourth-generation Toyota Supra, with the parts designed in partnership with Varis and promoted using his personal time attack Toyota Supra. Orido's RIDOX Supra is regarded as one of the best looking Supras in the tuning community and has been featured in several Hot Version segments, and video games, most notably as a rival car named Orimabu (a reference to Orido's name) in Genki's Tokyo Xtreme Racer series of video games.

In 2018, Orido launched the AKEa brand which specializes in body kits and other car exterior parts, as his own personal line of aero parts for modern cars. He has released "Max Orido x AKEa" kits for the first- and second-generation Toyota 86 and fifth-generation Toyota Supra. These kits emphasize a casual and timeless styling to complement the car's original design, and are offered unpainted, painted, or in carbon fiber.

Racing Record

Complete Super GT Results

Complete 24 Hours of Le Mans Results

D1 Grand Prix Results

References

External links

 Official site
 2004 SuperGT.net profile
 2005 SuperGT.net profile
 2006 SuperGT.net profile
 2007 SuperGT.net profile
 
 D1 Supporter profile

Japanese racing drivers
Drifting drivers
1968 births
Living people
D1 Grand Prix drivers
NASCAR drivers
Super GT drivers
World Touring Car Championship drivers
Formula D drivers
European Le Mans Series drivers